Elly de Groen-Kouwenhoven (born 23 December 1949 in The Hague as Elly Kouwenhoven, and now generally known as Els de Groen) is a Dutch author and politician, who served as a Member of the European Parliament 2004–2009. She was a member of Europe Transparent, which sat with the Greens/EFA party group. As an MEP, she was a member of the Committee on Civil Liberties, Justice and Home Affairs and the Committee on Petitions, as well as a member of the delegation to the EU–Bulgaria Joint Parliamentary Committee and a substitute for the delegation for relations with the countries of Southeast Europe.

Career
 Senior secondary teaching certificate
 French teacher (1970–1975)
 Writer, essayist and commentator
 Literary reviewer, children's books (1985–1992)
 Editor of the Algemeen Dagblad's children's newspaper (1986–1989)
 Has worked for 20 years on news magazines
 Author of various works of fiction and non-fiction for adults
 Her work over the last 20 years has placed a strong emphasis on Eastern Europe
 Unpaid adviser to the Dutch foundation 'Roma-Emancipatie' in Oss (since 2002)
 Various literary awards

References

External links 
 
 European Parliament biography
  Parlement.com biography
 

1949 births
Living people
Dutch children's writers
Dutch commentators
Dutch educators
Dutch women educators
Dutch essayists
Dutch journalists
Dutch literary critics
Dutch women literary critics
20th-century Dutch women writers
20th-century Dutch writers
Europe Transparent MEPs
MEPs for the Netherlands 2004–2009
21st-century women MEPs for the Netherlands
Dutch women journalists
Dutch women children's writers
Dutch women essayists
Writers from The Hague